The Auburn Speedster was an American car, manufactured by the Auburn Automobile Company of Auburn, Indiana and manufactured in Union City, Indiana. A total of 887 cars were manufactured between 1928 and 1936, across 3 series (1928-1930 with "eight" and "big eight" engines, the V12 series from 1931 to 1934, and the dramatic, iconic 1935-36 Supercharged 8 ).  The first two series were designed by stylist Alan Leamy.  The Auburn 851 Speedster of 1935 was styled by designer Gordon Buehrig, who also was responsible for the  Cord Model 810. Al Jenkins broke 70 America speed records in the 1935 car.

History
In 1924 Auburn output was down to six cars a day,  Errett Lobban Cord—a successful automobile salesman—took over the distressed company, and brought in James Crawford to design and develop a new range of vehicles. Other companies had already produced 'boat tail" autos (Peerless, Packard, Hudson) but Auburn endeavored in the car to have an image leader in an otherwise ordinary lineup of autos. The Speedster had a fixed windshield, but no side windows, no interior door release, and optional roof, a cramped cockpit for only two--yes in a glamorous, aerodynamic looking body.

First Series, 1928-1930 Auburn Eight (Eight-In-Line / 8-88 / Speedster 115, 120 and 125)
The first Auburn eight model was introduced in 1925, as the "Auburn Eight-In-Line". In the following year, it received an ungraded 4.8-liter side-valve 68 bhp Lycoming engine and was renamed "8-88".

That powertrain remained in use until 1930, when it developed 115 bhp, hence the "Speedster 115" model name. The car was of a straightforward and stout design. Suspension was by semi-elliptic springs all round, and after experiments with hydraulic brakes, Auburn opted for mechanical brakes. The three-speed gearbox was in unit with the engine. The impressive open two-seater body styled by Count Alexis de Sakhnoffsky featured a boat-tail and a vee windscreen.

The "Auburn Speedster 120" with the so-called "big eight" 268 cubic inch, 120 hp engine were built in 1928 and 1929. On a longer chassis and with a longer hood than the 8-88, 100 were built and today only maybe 8 are known to survive. 

In 1930, the Auburn Speedster was upgraded and it was renamed "Speedster 125". The Speedster 125 was advertised as a "racing car with comfort of a closed car" with a 125 bhp version of the Lycoming eight giving it a top speed of over 100 mph. It came with models such as "cabin speedster" and others.

Second series, 1931-1934 the Speedster 160
In 1931, a V12 range, using a 6.4-liter engine designed by George Kublin and built by Lycoming. As the depression was taking hold, the V12 was expensive and only about 25 of the "Auburn Speedster 160" were built. The V12 engine design was successful, and was used as the basis of the LaFrance engine, used for decades especially in fire trucks.

Third Series, 1935-1936 the Speedster 851

The "Speedster 851", which would be the final production model of the manufacturer, was introduced in 1934 with bodywork by Gordon Buehrig that was ingeniously constructed and cost-effectively built. With sandwiched front and rear fenders, backswept  radiator, and external side-threaded exhaust pipes, the 851 Speedster is the iconic Auburn "Hollywood car." Its bespoke flat-head eight was powerful, reliable and of a strong and solid design.

The sweeping body lines concealed some innovative and advanced technical features such as the Columbia dual-ratio rear axle that was achieved by interposing an epicyclic gear train between the axle and the crown wheel. When it was engaged, the final drive ratio became a "fast" 4.5:1. It was disengaged by moving a steering-wheel mounted lever and dipping the clutch, whereupon the ratio became a more leisurely 3:1. The three-speed synchromesh gearbox along with that dual ratio axle gave a six-speed transmission. In 1936 came the 852, identical to the earlier models with the exception of the "852" on its radiator grille. The final year of production was 1937 as Auburn ceased car production altogether in 1937. Only 143 of the 851SC boat tail speedsters were made.

Evolution
 1926: Engine size increased from 4.5 liters to 4.8 liters and the model renamed the 8-88.
 1927: The 68 hp engine uprated to 115 hp and the car is renamed the 115.
 1929: 120 development of 115 introduced.
 1930: 125 introduced.
  1931: 160 introduced
 1934: The best known Speedster—the 851—was introduced for the 1935 model year. It uses a 4.6-liter straight-eight engine, supercharged or unblown.
 1937: Auburn car production ceased.

Design and statistics (Speedster 851)

Engine
 Location: Front, longitudinal.
 Type: Water-cooled in-line flathead side-valve eight cylinder with aluminum alloy cylinder head.
 Cubic capacity: 4585 cc/280 cu in.
 Bore x stroke: 
 Valve gear: Two in-line valves per cylinder operated by block mounted camshaft.
 Fuel supply: Single Strombreg downdraft carburettor with Schweitzer-Cummins centrifugal supercharger. 
 Ignition: Coil and distributor, mechanical.
 Maximum power: 150 bhp @ 4000 rpm

Transmission
Layout: Clutch and gearbox in unit with engine.
Clutch: Single dry plate
Gearbox: Three speed manual with synchromesh on second and third ratios in 'high'
1st 2.86:1
2nd 1.68:1
3rd 1.0:1
Final drive: Spiral bevel with epicyclic gear dual ratio axle.
Ratio: 3:1 and 4.5:1

Suspension
Front: Non-independent with semi-elliptic leaf springs and hydraulic dampers.
Rear: Non-independent with live axle, semi-elliptic leaf springs and hydraulic dampers.

Steering
Type: Worm and peg.

Brakes
Type: Lockheed drums front and rear; hydraulically operated.

Wheel and tires
 Type: Steel welded spoke wheels with 6.50″ × 15″

Body/chassis
Type: Steel box section X-braced chassis with steel Speedster body, two doors, two seats.

Dimensions and weight
Length: 
Width: 
Weight:

Performance
 Maximum speed:

Reception and legacy

The Speedster's iconic "boattail" design would be replicated on cars from later decades, with the two most notable examples being the 1963–1967 Chevrolet Corvette Stingray and the 1971–1973 Buick Riviera.

In select early Detective Comics' Batman comics, the Batmobile appears to be modelled after Auburn 851 Speedster.

In film
The car is featured in the 1936 British film Lonely Road. Clive Brook refers to it as an "Auburn Supercharger".

Also seen at the beginning of Indiana Jones and the Temple of Doom.

References

External links

 1928–1936 Auburn Speedsters on HowStuffWorks
Auburn Boattail Speedster Takes First Best-of-the-Best AACA Zenith Award

Brass Era vehicles
Cars of the United States